Limnophis bangweolicus, the eastern striped swamp snake or Bangweulu water snake, is a species of natricine snake found in Zambia, the Democratic Republic of the Congo, Angola, and Botswana.

References

Limnophis
Reptiles of Zambia
Reptiles of the Democratic Republic of the Congo
Reptiles of Angola
Reptiles of Botswana
Reptiles described in 1936
Taxa named by Robert Mertens